Athena Farrokhzad (born 23 August 1983) is an Iranian-Swedish poet, playwright, translator and literary critic.

Career
Farrokhzad was born in Teheran, Iran, and grew up in the Hammarkullen and Askim areas of Gothenburg, Sweden. She now lives in Bagarmossen, a suburb of Stockholm. She is an instructor in the writing program at Nordens folk high school on the island of Biskops-Arnö in Lake Mälaren.

Publications
In 2013, Farrokhzad published a collection of poems titled Vitsvit (White Blight) with Albert Bonniers Förlag. The same year, her translation into Swedish of work by the Romanian poet Svetlana Cârstean appeared, and she made her debut as a playwright with Päron, which was performed by the youth section of Östgötateatern (the county theatre of Östergötland), directed by Kajsa Isakson. "White Blight", Jennifer Hayashida's translation of "Vitsvit," was published by Argos Books in 2015. It was shortlisted for the 2016 National Translation Awards (NTA) in Poetry, named one of Boston Globe's best poetry books of 2016, and reviews appeared in Slate, the Rumpus, Kenyon Review, and the Southeast Review. As of 2018, Vitsvit has been translated into 12 languages.

Vitsvit has been adapted into a theatre play on two occasions; one production by Unga Klara theatre company directed by Farnaz Arbabi, and one by the Swedish Radio Theatre, directed by Saga Gärde.

Farrokhzad has published two poetry anthologies, Manualen with Tova Gerge and Ett tunt underlag with the poetry group G=T=B=R=G, both in 2009. She edited the queer poetry anthology Omslag with Linn Hansén and has organized literary events such as Queerlitt, Demafor and World Poetry Day. She is also a literature critic for the newspaper Aftonbladet.

Sommar host
Farrokhzad hosted the Sveriges Radio show Sommar on P1 on 21 July 2014. Her show led to strong reactions from some listeners. Gunnar Axén of the Moderate Party expressed the opinion that her decision to play the Ebba Grön song Beväpna er ("Arm yourselves") was inappropriate and claimed to have thrown out his television so he could stop paying the license fee. The license fee, which must be paid by all households with a television, is used to fund not only television, but also radio. Others reacted more positively, including Ebba Grön lead singer Joakim Thåström and some reporters and listeners.  there had been 70 complaints to the Swedish Broadcasting Commission concerning Farrokhzad's show, the most complaints received about any host of the program. The show was however cleared on all counts. She was not included by SVT in the line-up for the television discussion show Sommarpratarna, but the program-makers denied she was left out due to the controversy surrounding her radio show.

Honors
Vitsvit was nominated for the 2013 August Prize in the literature category, for the Borås Tidnings debutantpris (a prize for new authors), and the Catapult Prize of the Swedish Writers' Union. Farrokhzad was joint winner of the Karin Boye Literary Prize in 2013 and in 2014 won the Stora Läsarpriset (Grand Reader's Prize).

References

External links

1983 births
Living people
Writers from Tehran
Swedish women poets
21st-century Swedish dramatists and playwrights
Swedish women dramatists and playwrights
Sommar (radio program) hosts
Swedish women radio presenters
Iranian emigrants to Sweden
Swedish translators
Swedish literary critics
Swedish women critics
Swedish women literary critics
Radio controversies
Controversies in Sweden
21st-century Swedish women writers
21st-century translators
21st-century Swedish poets